Witch trials took place in the Principality of Catalonia in Spain between the 14th-century and 1767. Witch trials were comparably uncommon in Spain, and most of them took place in Catalonia and Navarre. While witch trials were uncommon in the rest of Spain, the witch trials in Catalonia had similarities with the witch trials in the rest of Western Europe, and are therefore a separate chapter in the context of witch trials in Spain. Around 400 women were prosecuted for witchcraft in Catalonia.

Background
The first witch trials in Catalonia are noted to have taken place as early as the 14th-century. They normally resulted in mild sentences, such as fasting and pilgrimages. In 1427, an important case took place in Amer in Girona, were a woman by the name Margarita was accused for having caused the earthquake by having sacrificed children to Satan. She was acquitted by the Inquisition, but the case are believed to have influenced the strong belief in witchraft among the population in Catalonia.

Witch hunt
The witch trials in Catalonia became more common in the early 17th-century. Between 1615 and 1627, a mass witch hunt took place in Catalonia, which resulted in a number of witch trials in several locations.

Among the witch trials were the Terrassa witch trial (1615-1619) and the Viladrau witch trials (1618-1622), with six and fourteen executions respectively. In parallel, there were six witchcraft-related executions in Lluçanès, four in Taradell, four in Seva and four in El Bruc, three in Rupit and one in Vilalleons.

In the Vallès region, twenty people were executed: eight in Granollers (two of whom were men), six in Terrasa, three in Castellar del Vallès and one in Palau de Plegamans in Sant Miquel de Toudell, Sentmenat and La Garriga. Three were executed in the Bages region: one in Santpedor, one in Manresa, and one (Jerònima Muntanyola) in Sallent.

In Sant Feliu de Pallerols, Pere Torrent "Cufí" was executed for being a wizard. In 1622, the Royal Audience and the Spanish Inquisition took control over the witch hunt, which resulted in less executions until the witch hunt ended in 1627.

A second witch hunt took place in 1643, when 32 women were put on trial for sorcery in Capcir. They were however eventually released by the Bishop of Alet. After this, the witch trials in Catalonia became fewer. On 8 January 1767, María Pujol was executed for witchcraft in Catalonia. This was the last witchcraft execution in Catalonia and likely in Spain.

Legal process
In Catalonia, the witch trials were normally conducted by local secular courts, not by the Spanish Inquisition, who generally prioritised heresy rather than witchcraft persecutions, and often suppressed witch trials when they occurred. The secular courts issued investigations of witchcraft, used torture towards suspects, and conducted executions by hanging rather than by burning at the stake. The witch hunt in Catalonia centered around primarily women, who were accused of having attended the witches' sabbath, making a pact with Satan, and having caused natural disasters and causing bad weather, infertility, miscarriages, and illness among humans and animals. The witch hunts often occurred during periods of natural disasters such as earthquakes, floods, storms or other natural disasters which negatively affected the crops, or during times of epidemics.

References

Bibliography 
 Alcoberro, Agustí: Biblioteca bàsica d'Història de Catalunya "El segle de les bruixes", Ed. BARCANOVA.
 Perez Molina, Isabel: Duoda, Centre d'Investigació de Dones, Universitat de Barcelona.

Witch trials in Spain
History of Catalonia